Lakpa Gelu (born June 23, 1967), often spelled Lhakpa, is a Nepalese Sherpa climber born in Jubing - 1, KhariKhola, Solukhumbu, Nepal. He is known for holding a world record for the fastest climbing of Mount Everest (the world's tallest mountain at 8,848 meters, known to the Nepalese as "Sagarmatha") in only 10 hours 56 minutes and 46 seconds. Gelu's record-breaking trip was his tenth trip to the summit of the mountain.

Personal life
Lhakpa Gelu was born around June 23, 1967  in the Solukhumbu of Nepal. The ethnic Sherpa community in Nepal does not record exact birth dates, though, so it is impossible to know his precise birth date.

Lhakpa Gelu comes from a family of climbers. His older brother died in 1991 while climbing Annapurna, and his youngest brother has also climbed Mount Everest. He is married to Fulli and has three children.

In December 2006, Lhakpa Gelu moved to Utah. Despite his mountaineering accomplishments, Lhakpa struggled financially, as Sherpas are paid far less than Western guides. In Utah, he had difficulty finding work as a mountain guide, so instead he had to work at a coffee house, installing signs, and delivering pizzas while searching for employment as an expedition guide.

In 2008, Lhakpa began working as a guide for Alpine Ascents International, where he has guided expeditions up Mount Rainier and Aconcagua.

Speed climb of Everest
Gelu started for the summit at 5:00 p.m. on May 25, 2003, and reached on the summit at 3:56:46 a.m. on May 26. He returned to Base Camp at 11:20 a.m. on the 26th. (It is also reported that upon reaching the top, Gelu hoisted the Nepalese flag on a  brass pole.) The total time of his climb from Base Camp to the summit and back to Base Camp was 18 hours 20 minutes.

The record he beat (12 hours 45 minutes) was set just a few days earlier on May 23, 2003 by 25-year-old Pemba Dorjie, a Sherpa from Rolwaling Himal.

Lakpa Gelu was the climbing Sardar of the 12-member "Jubiläums Expedition Mt. Everest 2003". He began his ascent of Everest from the Southeast Ridge under the leadership of Eckhard Schmitt, a 56-year-old mountaineer from Schaftlach, Germany.

Other ascents
In addition to over a dozen Everest summits, Lhakpa has also summitted Cho Oyu and Ama Dablam in the Himalayas.

In 2007, Lhakpa climbed Everest to raise money for an elementary school in his hometown in Nepal and to increase public awareness of the contributions of the Sherpa people to Himalayan mountaineering.

See also
List of Mount Everest summiters by number of times to the summit
List of Mount Everest records
Lhakpa Sherpa (female Everest mountaineer)
List of Mount Everest guides

Notes

External links
Website dedicated to Apa Sherpa and Lhakpa Gelu Sherpa

1969 births
Living people
People from Solukhumbu District
Nepalese mountain climbers
Sherpa summiters of Mount Everest
Nepalese Buddhists
Nepalese summiters of Mount Everest